Cohen's horseshoe bat (Rhinolophus cohenae) is a species of bat belonging to the family Rhinolophidae, endemic to South Africa. It was first described in 2012. The species was named after Lientjie Cohen who collected the type specimen in 2004. It was first thought to be a Hildebrandt's horseshoe bat but has since been distinguished as a separate species by its unique echolocation frequencies.

Description
It has a wide leaf nose  and its lower lip has a single longitudinal groove that extends down to the chin. Its coat colourings are similar to Hildebrandt's horseshoe bat. It emits an ultrasound duty cycle and high frequency constant at about 32.8 ± 0.24 kHz.

Habitat
The species has only been observed in three locations in the South African province of Mpumalanga.

References

Endemic fauna of South Africa
Rhinolophidae
Mammals described in 2012
Fauna of South Africa
Bats of Africa